This list is of the properties and historic districts which are designated on the National Register of Historic Places or that were formerly so designated, in Hennepin County, Minnesota; there are 186 entries as of October 2021. A significant number of these properties are a result of the establishment of Fort Snelling, the development of water power at Saint Anthony Falls, and the thriving city of Minneapolis that developed around the falls. Many historic sites outside the Minneapolis city limits are associated with pioneers who established missions, farms, and schools in areas that are now suburbs in that metropolitan area.

Historical background

Father Louis Hennepin was the first European explorer to visit and name Saint Anthony Falls, the tallest waterfall on the Mississippi River, in 1680. While the falls were familiar to the Ojibwe and Sioux Indians who lived in the area, Father Hennepin spread word of the falls when he returned to France in 1683. The land east of the Mississippi came under England's control in 1763, and then became American territory after the American Revolutionary War in 1783. After the Louisiana Purchase in 1803, the western side of the falls became American territory as well.

Zebulon Pike explored the Mississippi River in 1805 and made a treaty with the Sioux to acquire land on either side of the Mississippi River from its confluence with the Minnesota River to Saint Anthony Falls. The United States did not do much to occupy the land until 1819, when Lieutenant Colonel Henry Leavenworth was ordered to establish a military post in the area. The following year, Colonel Josiah Snelling established a permanent fort at a blufftop site overlooking Pike Island and the confluence of the Mississippi and Minnesota Rivers. The fort, first named Fort Saint Anthony and later Fort Snelling, became an island of civilization in the wilderness.

In 1837, Franklin Steele established a claim for the land on the east side of Saint Anthony Falls. Within the next ten years, he established a sawmill at the falls, and lumbermen from the north began cutting trees and sending them to Steele's sawmill. In 1849, Steele subdivided his property and filed a plat for the town of Saint Anthony. Sawmilling and early flour milling attempts proved successful, and by 1855 the fledgling town of Saint Anthony had more than three thousand residents. The west side of the river was part of the Fort Snelling military reservation until it was released for development in 1854. In 1849, John H. Stevens obtained  of land on the west side of the falls in exchange for maintaining a ferry at the falls. Hennepin County was established in 1852, and the settlement on the west side of the river was given the name Minneapolis, as coined by Charles Hoag. The two towns prospered as a result of industries and businesses based around the falls, but business was better on the west side of the falls. Minneapolis incorporated as a city in 1867, and three years later it merged with the village of Saint Anthony.

Eventually, flour mills overtook sawmills as a dominant industry at the falls. In 1860, flour production stood at 30,000 barrels; it reached 256,100 barrels in 1869. By 1874, Charles A. Pillsbury and Company owned five mills at the falls, and in 1879, Washburn-Crosby Company (now General Mills) owned four mills. The former Washburn "A" Mill building on the west side of the falls exploded on May 2, 1878, but its owners quickly rebuilt the west side district, including a new, larger Washburn "A" Mill. Meanwhile, in 1880, Pillsbury began building the huge Pillsbury "A" Mill on the east side of the falls. It had a capacity of 4,000 barrels per day when it first opened. Improvements in milling technology made it possible to grind the tougher spring wheat into a finer product, producing Minnesota "patent" flour, the finest bread flour in the world at that time. By 1900, Minneapolis was grinding 14.1 percent of the world's grain.

Current listings

|}

Former listings

|}

See also
 List of National Historic Landmarks in Minnesota
 National Register of Historic Places listings in Minnesota

Notes

References

External links

 Minnesota National Register Properties Database —Minnesota Historical Society
 Minneapolis Heritage Preservation Commission - Minneapolis Landmarks & Historic Districts

Hennepin